Anak ng Kumander is a 2008 Filipino action film directed by Jose "Kaka" Balagtas, written by Rod Santiago, and starring Manny Pacquiao and Ara Mina. The film was released on January 1, 2008, as part of the 33rd Metro Manila Film Festival.

Cast
Manny Pacquiao as Kummander Idel
Ara Mina as Sandra Regalado
Valerie Concepcion as Ka Maya
Lara Morena as Ka Lara
Rogelio Pacquiao as Lt. Paredes
Roi Vinzon as Señor Boyong
Dante Rivero as Commander Oyong
Perla Bautista as Aling Marcela
Efren Reyes Jr. as Mayor Isaac Albor
Danny Labra as Pinggot
Cris Aguilar as Turalde
Jess Sanchez as Rabio
Long Mejia
Richard Duran as Carpio
Dan Alvaro as Sergeant Oste
Boy Roque as Rivero
Joe Balagtas as Captain Hadjie
Palito as Mang Puroy

Production
Filming ended on November 20, 2007, in San Leonardo, Nueva Ecija.

References

External links

2008 films
2008 action films
Filipino-language films
Films set in Basilan
Films shot in Nueva Ecija
Philippine action films
Films directed by Jose Balagtas